Edmílson (born 1976) is a retired Brazilian footballer.

Edmilson or Edmílson may also refer to:

 Edmilson (given name)
 Edmílson Barros de Souza, or simply Edmílson (born 1977), Brazilian retired association footballer
 Edmilson Dias de Lucena, or simply Edmilson (born 1968), Brazilian retired association footballer
 Edmílson dos Santos Carmo Júnior, or simply Edmílson (born 1987), Brazilian association footballer
 Edmílson dos Santos Silva, or simply Edmílson (born 1982), Brazilian association footballer
 Edmílson Gonçalves Pimenta, or simply Edmílson (born 1971), Brazilian retired association footballer
 Edmilson Junior, or simply Edmilson (born 1994), Belgian association footballer
 Edmilson Marques Pardal, or simply Edmilson (born 1980), Brazilian association footballer
 Edmílson Paulo da Silva, or simply Edmilson (born 1968), Brazilian retired association footballer
 Edmilson (footballer, born 2000), Bissau Guinean footballer born Edmilson Indjai Correia